The Pandemic Severity Assessment Framework (PSAF) is an evaluation framework which uses quadrants to evaluate both the transmissibility and clinical severity of a pandemic and to combine these into an overall impact estimate.
Clinical severity is calculated via multiple measures including case fatality rate, case-hospitalization ratios, and deaths-hospitalizations ratios, while viral transmissibility is measured via available data among secondary household attack rates, school attack rates, workplace attack rates, community attack rates, rates of emergency department and outpatient visits for influenza-like illness.

The PSAF superseded the 2007 linear Pandemic Severity Index (PSI), which assumed 30% spread and measured case fatality rate (CFR) to assess the severity and evolution of the pandemic. The United States Centers for Disease Control and Prevention (CDC) adopted the PSAF as its official pandemic severity assessment tool in 2014, and it was the official pandemic severity assessment tool listed in the CDC's National Pandemic Strategy at the time of the COVID-19 pandemic.

Measures used in the framework 

Historically, measures of pandemic severity were based on the case fatality rate. However, the case fatality rate might not be an adequate measure of pandemic severity during a pandemic response because:
 Deaths may lag several weeks behind cases, making the case fatality rate an underestimate
 The total number of cases may not be known, making the case fatality rate an overestimate
 A single case fatality rate for the entire population may obscure the effect on vulnerable sub-populations, such as children, the elderly, those with chronic conditions, and members of certain racial and ethnic minorities
 Fatalities alone may not account for the full effects of the pandemic, such as absenteeism or demand on healthcare services

To account for the limitations of measuring the case fatality rate alone, the PSAF rates severity of a disease outbreak on two dimensions: clinical severity of illness in infected persons; and the transmissibility of the infection in the population. Each dimension can be measured using more than one measure, which are scaled to facilitate comparison. Having multiple measures for each dimension offers flexibility to choose a measure that is readily available, accurate, and representative of the impact of the pandemic. It also allows comparison across measures for a more complete understanding of the severity. The framework gives commentary on the strengths and limitations of various measures of clinical severity and transmissibility as well as guidelines for scaling them. It also provides examples of assessing past pandemics using the framework.

Measures of transmissibility 

The original documentation for the PSAF includes the following as potential measures of transmissibility:
 Basic reproduction number R0 and serial interval
 Estimated attack rate (community, household, school, workplace)
 Medically-attended outpatient influenza-like illness visits
 Underlying population immunity
 Genetic markers of transmissibility
 Animal transmission experiments
 School/workplace absenteeism, including healthcare workers

Measures of clinical severity 

The original documentation for the PSAF includes the following as potential measures of clinical severity:
 Case fatality rate and case hospitalization rate
 Ratio of deaths to hospitalizations
 Genetic markers of virulence
 Animal immunopathologic experiments
 Percent of emergency department visits that resulted in hospitalization
 Percent of hospitalizations admitted to intensive care unit
 Rate of hospitalization
 Excess deaths

Severity of past pandemics using the Pandemic Severity Assessment Framework 

The original developers of the PSAF provided a model for the number of hypothetical deaths in the United States 2010 population of an influenza pandemic using the PSAF. While the axes of the PSAF are scaled measures of transmissibility and clinical severity, this model uses the case-fatality ratio instead of the scaled measure of clinical severity and the cumulative incidence of infection instead of the scaled measure of transmissibility.

Influenza severity 

During its development, the PSAF was applied to past influenza pandemics and epidemics, resulting in the following assessments:

COVID-19 pandemic severity 
A team of Brazilian researchers preliminarily assessed the severity of the COVID-19 pandemic using the PSAF in April 2020 based on Chinese data through 11 February 2020. In their preliminary assessment, they rate COVID-19's scaled transmissibility at 5 and its scaled clinical severity at 4 to 7, placing the COVID-19 pandemic in the "very high severity" quadrant. This preliminary assessment ranks the COVID-19 pandemic as the most severe pandemic since the 1918 influenza pandemic.

While the CDC has not published a PSAF rating for the COVID-19 pandemic, they maintain best estimates of some of the relevant transmissibility and clinical severity measures for scenario planning.

SARS-CoV-2 variants 

Different variants of SARS-CoV-2 can have unique transmissibility and clinical severity. Multiple variants have been determined to have higher transmissibility and severity than the original strain.

See also 
 COVID-19 pandemic in the United States
 Early Warning and Response System
 Influenza pandemic
 Pandemic Severity Index
 WHO pandemic phases

References

Medical assessment and evaluation instruments
Centers for Disease Control and Prevention
Epidemics
International medical and health organizations
Influenza pandemics
Public health